Eau Claire is a community in Columbia, South Carolina.

Location
The Eau Claire community is generally bordered by North Main Street and Monticello Road to the east, River Drive and Sunset Drive to the south, the Broad River to the west, and Interstate 20 to the north.

Etymology
Eau Claire derives its name from the French for "clear water".

References

External links
 Eau Claire's Epodunk site

Columbia metropolitan area (South Carolina)
Geography of Columbia, South Carolina
Neighborhoods in South Carolina